is a Japanese uncarbonated soft drink, manufactured by , a subsidiary of Asahi Breweries headquartered in Shibuya, Tokyo.

The beverage has a light, somewhat milky, and slightly acidic flavour, similar to plain or vanilla flavoured yogurt or Yakult. Its ingredients include water, nonfat dry milk and lactic acid, and is produced by lactic acid fermentation.

The drink is sold as a concentrate which is mixed with water or sometimes milk just before consumption. It is also used to flavour kakigōri (shaved ice) and as a mixer for cocktails and chūhai.

Name
Mishima's first two attempts, Daigomi and Daigoso, were named after the word . Inspiration was taken from the Sanskrit word sarpir-maṇḍa, which is regarded as the greatest of all flavours in Buddhism. He wanted to do the same for Calpis and initially named it Calpir, constructing a portmanteau by combining cal from calcium and pir from sarpir-maṇḍa. However, after consulting musician  and Buddhist priest , Mishima chose pis from sarpiṣ instead.

Primarily in North America, the name Calpis is changed to Calpico with カルピス in katakana either below or on the reverse side of the packaging—this alteration to the name ensures that any unintended associations with the English slang word for urine ("piss") are avoided.

Packaging
The polka dot packaging used to be white dots against a blue background until the colours were inverted in 1953. The design was intended to represent the Milky Way, in reference to the Japanese festival, Tanabata on 7 July, a tradition seen as the start of the summer.

In 1919, Calpis held an international poster exhibition in collaboration with the Ministry of Foreign Affairs. The contest was held to provide aid to struggling European painters due to the inflation caused by World War I. After German painter Otto Dünkelsbühler won 3rd place, Calpis began using a new logo in 1923. It featured an illustration of a black man with large lips and a Panama hat drinking from a glass using a straw. As the logo came to be considered offensive, the black/white was first reversed, and then the logo was subsequently dropped altogether in January 1990. The complaint was initially filed by 12-year-old Futoshi Arita, a member of The Association to Stop Racism Against Blacks.

History

The founder of Calpis, Kaiun Mishima, travelled to the Mongolian region of northern China (Inner Mongolia) in 1902, encountering a traditional cultured milk product known as airag (called kumis throughout most of Central Asia). The active ingredient in airag, responsible for its unique flavour, is lactic acid produced by lactobacilli bacteria. Mishima was inspired to develop his own version after the airag helped return his digestion to normal.

His first attempt was Daigomi, launched in 1916. It was made by culturing cream with lactic acid bacteria. However, Daigomi was discontinued because of two major flaws: the amount of cream extracted from milk was inadequate for mass production, and there was a surplus of skim milk created as a by-product. Afterwards, Mishima created Daigoso by culturing skimmed milk with lactic acid bacteria. However, the product was also discontinued because of poor sales. His last unsuccessful attempt was Lacto Caramel, a product that contained live lactic acid bacteria. It was discontinued because the product melted during the summer.

Mishima went back to further developing Daigoso and created Calpis by chance. One day, he decided to add sugar to Daigoso and left it overnight. After being satisfied with the taste, Calpis was officially released on July 7, 1919, at the price of ¥1.60 per bottle. Diluting Calpis with water proved to be economical, quickly garnering popularity with the people, along with the catchphrase "the taste of first love".
	
For some time, Calpis had the image of being a special drink. Until the 1950s, it was often served to guests on special occasions or used as a gift. It was only around 1965 that it began to be treated as a normal beverage in ordinary households. 

Apart from the original flavour, orange-flavoured Calpis was released in 1958. Two years later, pineapple-flavoured and grape-flavoured Calpis were released. A carbonated version called Calpis Soda was also released in 1974.

In 1973, sales plummeted after the price was raised. However, the prediluted version released in 1991 became a huge success. Within the first year of its release, 20.5 million cases of Calpis Water had been sold. It was also around this time that the company moved towards the use of paper and plastic containers. 

In 2009, marketers aimed to change the image of Calpis once more. They billed it as a healthy beverage in an attempt to shy away from the idea that Calpis was only for children. Following that change, Calpis shipments in the last 10 years have grown by 1.5 times the previous amount.

See also

Actimel
Asahi – wholly owning parent company of Calpis
Fermented milk products
List of fermented foods
Milkis
Pocari Sweat
Wahaha
Yakult

References

External links

 Calpis official website
 Calpis Official website  (Archive)
 Asahi Group Company Listings 

Asahi Breweries
Drink companies of Japan
Fermented drinks
Japanese companies established in 1919
Japanese drinks
Soft drinks
Food and drink companies based in Tokyo